Sebastian Alejandro Kind (born 1979) is an Argentinian engineer in the field of renewable energy. He is a policy maker, advisor and awarded public official who served as Undersecretary of Renewable Energy  at the Ministry of Energy in Argentina between 2016 and 2019, from where he led the country's energy transition towards a cleaner matrix through a successful and innovative program named RenovAr. In 2018 he was appointed as Chair of the Council of the International Renewable Energy Agency (IRENA). In 2019, he received the Clean Energy Award of the Latin American and Caribbean Council on Renewable Energy (LAC- CORE) and the Climate Breakthrough Project award. Kind also received in 2019 the LIDE award of the year in recognition to his contribution to the Energy sector.

study Career and education 
Sebastian Kind is a mechanical engineer from the National Technological University of Buenos Aires (Argentina). He began his career in the renewable energy sector, specifically in the wind power area, working first for BP in London and then at the Joint venture of BP/Bridas in Argentina as Head of Alternative Energy.

In 2010 he founded the MS in Renewable Energy at the National Technological University (Argentina) and was its Director until 2017. In this regard he claimed that "Argentina has to diversify its energy mix and the renewable energy is one of the pathways for such diversification [...] The aim is to train professionals that will become leaders in the local industry".

Between 2013 and 2015, he performed as advisor to the Senate and drafted Act 27,191, that was unanimously approved by Congress. This law set the policy framework and objectives that he is currently putting in practice as a government official.

Throughout the course of his tenure as Undersecretary of Renewable Energy he was responsible for the drafting of the entire regulatory framework for renewables including the RenovAr program, the FODER trust fund and the PPA regulation, among others. During Argentina's G20 presidency in 2018, he co-led the first Forum on renewable energy and energy efficiency at the Energy Transitions Working Group (ETWG) meetings in Buenos Aires.

In May 2018, he was appointed Chair of the Council of the International Renewable Energy Agency (IRENA). 
 Kind also earned an MS in Renewable Energy from the EUREC Agency in Brussels (Belgium)/ NTUA in Athens (Greece)/University of Zaragoza (Spain).

Awards and fellowships 
In 2018 he was appointed as Chair of the Council of the International Renewable Energy Agency (IRENA), and was selected as Fellow of the Eisenhower Foundation (EF) in Philadelphia and as Global Leader of the World Economic Forum (WEF) in Geneva in recognition of his accomplishments. In 2019, he received the Clean Energy Award of the Latin American and Caribbean Council on Renewable Energy (LAC- CORE) and the Climate Breakthrough Project award (an initiative of the Packard Foundation with the support of the Oak, Good Energies, and IKEA Foundations) for developing GREENMAP (Global Renewable Energy Mass Adoption Program), a breakthrough strategy to help deploying renewables at a global scale. Kind also received in 2019 the LIDE award of the year in recognition to his contribution to the Energy sector.

Personal life 
Kind lives in Buenos Aires, Argentina, with his wife and two children.

References

External links 

 FORBES (October 15, 2019) - Argentina May Be The Hottest Renewable Energy Market You Haven't Heard Of. Can It Spur a Global Boom?
RENEWABLE NOW (March 13, 2018) - Vestas to Have Assembly Base in Argentina
IFC (February 20, 2018) - RenovAr (Argentina): Scaling 'Express Edition'
REUTERS (November 29, 2017) - Argentina awards 1,408.7 MW to Renewable Energy Projects
RECHARGE NEWS (September 28, 2018) - Argentina's Renewables Plans 'Shielded' from Crisis: Top Official
LA NACION (April 20, 2018) - The Argentinian Renewable Energy Business Became a Case Study at Harvard
EL PAIS (March 20, 2018) - Argentina Makes The Leap to Renewables
INFOBAE (November 24, 2017) - Another record for The Renewable Energies
 EL PAIS (October 20, 2017) - Renewable energies, The Rock Star of Investments in Argentina
EL PAIS (July 31, 2017) - After Decades of Deep Crises Argentina Supports Renewable Energies
IFC (April 1, 2017) - A New Dawn: Argentina Taps Into Its Renewable Energy Potential
BLOOMBERG (March 10, 2017) - Argentina Plans Energy Auctions to Drive $7 Billion Investment
WORLD BANK (March 1, 2017) - World Bank/Argentina: Promoting Private Investment in Renewable Energy
DEUTSCHE WELLE (Jan 24, 2017) - Argentina Strongly Committed to Renewables
BNAMERICAS (December 16, 2016) - Green Climate Fund approves US$133mn Argentina energy loan
GREEN CLIMATE FUNDS (December 15, 2016) - Catalyzing private investment in sustainable energy in Argentina
BLOOMBERG (September 5, 2016) - Argentina Clean-Power Auction Attracts Proposals for 6 Gigawatts
REUTERS (May 19, 2016) - World Bank's IFC sees investor interest in Argentina renewables

Living people
1979 births
Date of birth missing (living people)
Place of birth missing (living people)
National Technological University alumni
International Renewable Energy Agency people
Political office-holders in Argentina